Osama Abdusalam (born 23 February 1983) is a Libyan former footballer.

External links 
 
 

1983 births
Living people
Libyan footballers
Libya international footballers
Association football midfielders
Libyan expatriate footballers
Libyan expatriate sportspeople in Tunisia
Expatriate footballers in Tunisia
Stade Nabeulien players
People from Cyrenaica
Al Akhdar SC players